HD 11025 (HR 525) is a suspected astrometric binary in the southern circumpolar constellation Octans. It has an apparent magnitude of 5.67, making it visible to the naked eye if viewed under ideal conditions.

The visible component is a yellow giant of spectral class G8 III. At present it has 2.61 times the mass of the Sun but at an age of 500 million years, has expanded to 9.52 times the radius of the Sun.

References

Octans
G-type giants
011025
007568
0525
PD-85 17
Octantis, 4